2013 European Youth Olympic Festival may refer to:

2013 European Youth Summer Olympic Festival
2013 European Youth Winter Olympic Festival